The Electronic Font Foundry (EFF) was a business engaged in the design and sale of computer fonts. It was established in 1984 and produced fonts in PostScript, TrueType and  formats. It produced fonts in more than 60 languages. The company's public domain  CD-ROM, released in 1997, includes conversions of public domain fonts to the  format. It also includes a cataloguing tool.

References

External links 

1997 Public Domain RISC OS CD image

Commercial type foundries
Software companies of the United Kingdom
Companies based in Ascot, Berkshire
Software companies established in 1984
1984 establishments in England
RISC OS